Corzine is a surname. Notable people with the surname include:

 Amy Corzine, American writer
 Dave Corzine (born 1956), basketball player
 Jon Corzine (born 1947), former CEO of MF Global, former Governor on New Jersey, former CEO of Goldman Sachs
 Red Corzine (1909–2003), American football player
 Roy A. Corzine (1882–1957), Illinois state representative and farmer